The Honda CBF1000 is a sport touring motorcycle, part of the CBF series produced by Honda from 2006 to 2018. It is powered by a 998 cc inline-four engine, which is based on the CBR1000RR Fireblade engine. The CBF1000 has a steel frame also based on the frame of another model, the CBF600. Produced by Honda Italia Industriale S.p.A., the CBF1000 was first available in March 2006, mainly in the European market.

The chief designer, Ishu Akari, targeted riders over 30, that prefer smooth progressive acceleration combined with a relaxed riding position and easy handling. In comparison to the high-revving characteristic of the CBR1000RR's engine, the CBF1000's engine has a more level power delivery, better suited to touring and relatively inexperienced riders. Although peak power and peak torque are significantly lower than the CBR1000RR engine, power and torque are higher in the lower rev range. The CBF1000 has programmed fuel injection (PGM-FI). Anti-lock braking system is an option but a combined half-fairing is standard. The handlebars, seat height, and screen height are adjustable.

The CBF1000GT version adds a full lower fairing, panniers, and top box. The CBF1000F, a new design, was released in 2010. The major changes were a new frame, made of aluminum rather than steel, four-into-one exhaust system replacing the original four-into-two, new digital instrument panels, and a redesigned fairing/screen. Power was also increased while weight and fuel consumption were reduced.

Specifications

References 

 

CBF1000
Motorcycles introduced in 2006
Sport touring motorcycles